Margaret Lee Alison Johansen ( Alison, September 7, 1896 – December 28, 1959) was an American writer from Alabama. She received the Newbery Honor.

Early and personal life

Johansen was born Margaret Lee Alison on September 7, 1896, in Richmond, Alabama, to Annie Goode Hearst and John Dill Alison. She studied at Converse College from 1912 to 1914, the University of Alabama in 1918, and Columbia University in 1922. She was a member of the Delta Delta Delta and Theta Sigma Phi sororities. She married Carl Christian Johansen, adding his surname to hers.

Writing career

Johansen wrote many books, mostly or all for children, between 1924 and 1950. She often collaborated with her sister Alice Alison Lide to write books, and also wrote under the pseudonym "Hugh McAlister," likely also with Lide, to write books aimed at boys. Her first known published work was History of St. Paul's Parish, written with Lide and published in 1924. She continued to publish books throughout her life, the most notable probably being Ood-Le-Uk the Wanderer, a 1930 book which won a 1931 Newbery Honor.

Death

Johansen died on December 28, 1959, in Selma, Alabama, and was buried in the churchyard of Selma's St. Paul's Episcopal Church.

Bibliography

Published as Margaret Alison Johansen

Solo work
 Hawk of Hawk Clan: 1941
 Voyagers West: 1959
 From Sea to Shining Sea: How Americans Have Lived: 1960

With Alice Alison Lide
 History of St. Paul's Parish: 1924
 Ood-Le-Uk the Wanderer: 1930
 Pearls of Fortune: 1931
 Dark Possession: 1934
 Secret of the Circle: 1937
 Thord Firetooth: 1937
 Mystery of the Mahteb: A Tale of Thirteenth-Century Ethiopia: 1942
 The Wooden Locket: 1953
 Lapland Drum: 1955
 Magic Words for Elin: 1955
 Elin of Finland: 1960

Published as Hugh McAlister
 Conqueror of the High Road: 1930
 Flaming River: 1930
 Flight of the Silver Ship: 1930
 Stand By: 1930
 Steve Holworth of the Oldham Works: 1930
 Viking of the Sky: 1930
 Sea Gold: 1931
 That Boy at Roaring Brook Farm: 1931

References

External links
 

1896 births
1959 deaths
20th-century American novelists
20th-century American women writers
American children's writers
American women novelists
Columbia University alumni
Converse University alumni
Newbery Honor winners
University of Alabama alumni
Writers from Alabama
People from Dallas County, Alabama